José Miguel Bermúdez Ríos (born 9 January 1979 in Málaga, Andalusia), sometimes known simply as José, is a Spanish footballer who plays as a goalkeeper.

External links

1979 births
Living people
Footballers from Málaga
Spanish footballers
Association football goalkeepers
Segunda División players
Segunda División B players
Tercera División players
FC Barcelona C players
FC Barcelona Atlètic players
CE Mataró players
Benidorm CF footballers
Burgos CF footballers
UE Figueres footballers
Logroñés CF footballers
Cultural Leonesa footballers
CD Toledo players
UB Conquense footballers
CD Guijuelo footballers
UE Cornellà players